Varonis Systems is a software company with headquarters in New York City with R&D offices in Herzliya, Israel. They developed a security software platform that allows organizations to track, visualize, analyze and protect unstructured data. Varonis performs User Behavior Analytics (UBA) that identifies abnormal behavior from cyberattacks. Their software extracts metadata from an enterprise's IT infrastructure and uses this information to map relationships among employees, data objects, content, and usage.

History 
Varonis Systems was founded in 2005 by Yaki Faitelson and Ohad Korkus, in order to address security issues such as file activity tracking, information rights management, and access control. Prior to Varonis, Faitelson and Korkus worked at the global professional services and systems integration divisions of NetVision and NetApp.

Faitelson and Korkus invented a solution that would retrieve metadata contained in file systems. They brought in Dr. Jacob Goldberger, an expert in statistical modeling and machine learning, to help develop the algorithms that would provide the user-data link. In 2005, Faitelson, Goldberger, and Korkus filed a patent, “Automatic management of storage access control", which was granted in 2006. The result of their work was the Intelligent Data Use (IDU) classification platform, a platform for gathering and analyzing file data use. The first product based on this platform, DatAdvantage, was released in 2006  built so that enterprises can monitor file activity and user behavior, and manage data ownership, data access rights, and responsibilities of file system data.

Varonis continued with core platform development. In 2009, Varonis added the IDU Classification Framework, which allowed Varonis products to search for keywords, phrases and patterns from file content. In 2013, Varonis released DatAlert to detect and uncover insider threats and potential data breaches, notifying and alerting on suspicious file system activity including unusual access to sensitive data and changes to permissions and configuration files.

Varonis raised capital from Accel Partners, Evergreen Venture Partners, Pitango Venture Capital, and EMC.

Technology and Architecture 
The Varonis Metadata Framework is implemented at two levels. Non-intrusive monitoring resides on file servers, feeding both real-time file event information and ACLs to a separate server. The collected data is stored in a database. The second part, the IDU analytics engine, performs statistical analysis to derive data owners, baseline user activity, and user groupings. The Metadata Framework is able to incrementally index file metadata, thereby allowing it to maintain the current state of file metadata in its database. DatAdvantage presents this information to IT administrators. As of April 30, 2016, Varonis had 28 issued patents in the United States and 43 pending U.S. patent applications.

Products

Supported Platforms 
 Office 365
 Windows
 UNIX/Linux (but no DatAnywhere client)
 SharePoint
 Exchange
 Office 365
 Active Directory/LDAP
 EMC NAS
 NetApp NAS
 HP NAS
 Hitachi NAS
 IBM Storewize V7000

Customers 
 EMC2
 Barclays Capital
 Phillip Morris
 Boston University
 Sirius XM Radio

Awards 
 Fast 50 Reader Favorites of 2008
 Network World – 10 enterprise software companies to watch

References

 

Companies listed on the Nasdaq
American companies established in 2005
Software companies of Israel
Software companies established in 2005
Software companies of the United States
Software companies based in New York City